Klena may refer to

 Klenät, a fried pastry common in the Nordic countries
Derek Klena (born 1991), American actor and singer
Klenie Bimolt (born Klena Bimolt in 1945), Dutch swimmer